Heineken Open may refer to:
Heineken Open (tennis), a men's tennis tournament in Auckland, New Zealand
Heineken Open (golf), a golf tournament (now known as the Catalan Open)